Estivella is a town and municipality in the province of Valencia, Spain, to the north of the provincial capital city, Valencia, near the Serra Calderona. It is surrounded by countryside, all of it planted mostly with orange trees.  The climate is mild.

References

Municipalities in the Province of Valencia
Camp de Morvedre